Brigita Brezovac (September 24, 1979) is a retired Slovenian professional bodybuilder.

Early life and education
Brezovac grew up Ljutomer, Slovenia. She attended the SETUAŠ school in Murska Sobota, Slovenia and the University of Maribor.

Bodybuilding career

Amateur
At the age of 14 years, Brezovac had a boyfriend who had a small gym at his home. When she saw the photos of Cory Everson and Anja Langer, she decided she wanted to be a bodybuilder and lift weights, along with train for karate.

In 2001, after only three months of preparations, Brezovac competed in the 2001 World championship in category Miss Bodybuilding and came in fourth place. After coming in fourth place at the 2001 World Championship she went into the Miss Fitness category due to an injury. In 2004, at the World Championship, the prejudging judges disqualified her from fitness class and put her into bodybuilding category because she was too muscular. She went on to win the bodybuilding class. After that she was told that she should compete in bodybuilding because her physique is more appropriate for it.

In 2009, Brezovac competed in the IFBB, World Women's Championship. She placed second in bodybuilding heavy weight class and was awarded her IFBB pro card in December 2009.

Professional
In 2010, the year of her pro-debut, she won the IFBB bodybuilding competitions of Tampa Pro and Europa Battle of Champions. She qualified for her first Ms. Olympia that year, and placed tenth in it. In 2011, she won the Toronto Pro Super Show and came in third at the Tampa Pro and attended her second Ms. Olympia that year, and placed third in it. In 2012 and 2013, every Ms. International and Ms. Olympia competition she attended she placed within the top six every time.

Retirement
After attending the 2013 Ms. Olympia, Brezovac retired from bodybuilding.

Legacy
In 2013, the year she retired, Brezovac ranks as the 5th best female bodybuilder in the IFBB Pro Women's Bodybuilding Ranking List.

Competition history 
 2001 World championship IBFA Koper, Slovenia (Miss Body Building) - 4th
 2004 World championship IBFA Koper, Slovenia (Miss Body Building) - 1st
 2004 Grand Prix Trofeo Athenas Venezia, Italy (Miss Body Building) - 2nd
 2005 European championship NABBA Solingen, Germany (Miss Physique) - 2nd
 2005 European championship IBFA Sapri, Italy (Miss Physique) - 1st
 2006 World championship Universe WPF Le Grande Motte, France (Miss Physique) - 1st
 2007 World championship Universe NABBA Southport, UK (Miss Physique) - 2nd
 2006 Slovenian Open IBFA Maribor, Slovenia (Miss Bodybuilding) - 1st
 2006 World championship IBFA Las Vegas, USA (Miss Bodybuilding) - 1st and overall
 2006 World championship IBFA Las Vegas, USA (Mixed pairs) - 1st
 2006 World championship Universe NAC Cuxhaven, Germany (Miss Body) - 1st
 2007 Grand Prix Dionysopolis Balchik, Bolgaria (Miss bodybuilding) - 1st and overall
 2007 Grand Prix Due Torri Bologna, Italy (Miss hard) - 3rd
 2007 World championship Universe NAC Hamburg, Germany (Miss Body) - 1st
 2009 Grand Prix Dionysopolis Balchik, Bolgaria (Miss bodybuilding) - 1st and overall
 2009 Worlds Women Championship Como, Italy (Bodybuilding, heavy weight) - 2nd
 2010 IFBB Tampa Pro - 1st
 2010 IFBB Europa Battle of Champions - 1st
 2010 IFBB Ms. Olympia - 10th
 2011 IFBB Toronto Pro Super Show - 1st
 2011 IFBB Pro Bodybuilding Weekly Championships - 3rd
 2011 IFBB Ms. Olympia - 3rd
 2012 IFBB Ms. International - 6th
 2012 IFBB Ms. Olympia - 5th
 2013 IFBB Ms. International - 4th
 2013 IFBB Ms. Olympia - 5th

Fitness career

Contest history
 2001 International Miss Fitness Kitzbuehl (Austria) - 3rd
 2002 Slovenian Open IBFA Koper, Slovenia (Miss Fitness) - 1st
 2002 World championship IBFA Taranto, Italy (Miss Fitness) - 4th
 2003 Slovenian Open IBFA Koper, Slovenia (Miss Fitness) - 3rd
 2003 World championship IBFA Auxerre, France (Mixed Pairs) - 1st
 2004 World championship WABBA Bangalore, India (Miss Fitness) - 3rd
 2004 World championship WFF Vilnius, Lithuania (Extreme Body) - 4th

Personal life 
She also did taekwondo and boxing. Other professions of her include couching, economist, masseuse, and personal trainer. She speaks English, German, Croatian, and Serbian. She currently lives in Maribor, Slovenia.

References

External links 

Bio page
Facebook profile
Twitter profile
Myspace profile
Linkedin

1979 births
20th-century Slovenian people
21st-century Slovenian people
Fitness and figure competitors
Living people
Sportspeople from Dubai
People from Ljutomer
People from Ptuj
People from Venice, Los Angeles
Professional bodybuilders
Sportspeople from California
Sportspeople from Melbourne
Sportspeople from New York (state)
Sportspeople from New York City
Sportspeople from Los Angeles County, California
Slovenian female bodybuilders
American female bodybuilders
21st-century Slovenian women
20th-century Slovenian women
21st-century American women